A medication is a drug used to diagnose, cure, treat, or prevent disease.

Medication may also refer to: 

 Drug, any chemical substance that alters the normal bodily function
 Pharmaceutical drug, any substance intended for use in the diagnosis, cure, mitigation, treatment, or prevention of disease
 Small molecule drugs
 Biologic medical products that are regulated like drugs
 A herbal medicine

Music
 Medication (band), a hard rock band
 "Medication", a song by Garbage from Version 2.0
 "Medication", a song by Queens of the Stone Age from Lullabies to Paralyze
 "Medication", a song by the Standells from Dirty Water

See also
Medicate (disambiguation)